The Taipei Medical University Shuang-Ho Hospital is a hospital in Zhonghe District, New Taipei, Taiwan. It is the affiliated hospital of Taipei Medical University.

History
The hospital was opened on 1 July 2008. It was accredited by Joint Commission International in 2009 and reaccredited in 2012 and 2015.

Departments
 Internal medicine
 Surgery
 Geriatrics and gerontology
 Obstetrics and gynecology/pediatrics
 Dentistry
 Others

Capacity
The hospital has a capacity of 1,500 beds.

Transportation
The hospital is accessible within walking distance west of Jingan Station of Taipei Metro.

See also
 List of hospitals in Taiwan

References

External links

 

2008 establishments in Taiwan
Hospitals established in 2008
Hospitals in New Taipei
Zhonghe District